Devadatta is the cousin of the Buddha and known for exemplifying the sin of schism in Buddhism.

Devadatta may also refer to:

Religion
The name of the conch shell used by Arjuna on the Kurukshetra battle-field in the Bhagavad Gītā
The name of Kalki's white horse
One of the five upaprāṇas among the ten prānas

Other
Devadatta Shastri, commentator on the Kama Sutra
V. Devadatta, Kannada film director; see Psycho
Devadatta Joardar, translator; see Joe Winter
A character in the tokusatsu film Warrior of Love Rainbowman

Theophoric names